The skulpin (Physiculus helenaensis), also known as the St Helena mora,  is a species of morid cod endemic to the waters around Saint Helena.   This species reaches  in total length.

References

Physiculus
Fauna of Saint Helena
Taxa named by Christopher David Paulin
Fish described in 1989
Taxonomy articles created by Polbot